"Around the World" is a song by American rock band Red Hot Chili Peppers, appearing as the opening track on their seventh studio album Californication (1999). The song was released as the album's second single on August 23, 1999. The single peaked at number seven on the Billboard Modern Rock Tracks and number 16 on the Mainstream Rock Tracks.

In 2007, the song was heavily edited and used as a new soundtrack for the Rockin' California Screamin' ride at Disney California Adventure, as part of their "Rockin' Both Parks" campaign. The song was also used as the opening theme for the 2010 live-action film adaptation of Beck. In 2011, a live version was one of the thirty songs by thirty different artists featured on the Songs for Japan charity album.

Meaning
Anthony Kiedis has stated that in the lyrics for the verses he is telling about his journeys and his experiences on them, about being a member of the Red Hot Chili Peppers and living an extreme life. He also noted that Roberto Benigni's film Life Is Beautiful was a lyrical inspiration.

John Frusciante came up with the music for the song while playing at his house and told the other band members they would have to hear it but he had to play it with somebody because of its deceptive downbeat. Chad Smith kept time on the hi-hat while Frusciante played. Band members liked the outcome and Flea came up with his bass part.

The different final chorus originates from a request from Flea's daughter. While writing the album in Flea's garage his daughter would listen to their songs. At the time of writing, Kiedis was struggling to come up with lyrics for the songs, so just filled in with scat. When a final draft of the album was made and Flea's daughter listened to the final version, she was disappointed that the scat had been removed. So, on the final version of the song in the last chorus, the original scatting vocal was used instead.

When recording the song John Frusciante played a '66 Fender Jaguar which he had borrowed from their engineer Jim Scott. He played it through two Marshalls: a JTM 45 and a 100-watt SuperBass. Frusciante told that he liked Jaguars because of their "real cool cheap sound".

Flea played on a Modulus Flea Bass (Silver Flake) on the song. He also uses the Modulus in the music video.

Music video
A music video was made for the song and was released on September 14, 1999. The video was directed by Stéphane Sednaoui, who had previously made videos for other Chili Peppers songs such as "Breaking the Girl", "Scar Tissue" and "Give It Away". The latter in particular, with its unique, chaotic visual style, is similar to "Around the World"; Sednaoui used similar visual techniques in the video for R.E.M.'s song "Lotus". The video was featured on an episode of MTV's Making the Video.

Live performances 
"Around the World" has remained a constant staple on the band's tours since 1999, making it one of their top ten most performed songs.

The band Mr. Bungle performed a mock version of the song in 1999, as part of a halloween concert parodying Red Hot Chili Peppers.

Track listings
CD 1
 "Around the World" – 3:58
 "Parallel Universe" (demo) – 5:33
 "Teatro Jam" – 3:06

CD 2
 "Around the World" – 3:59
 "Me and My Friends" (live) – 3:08
 "Yertle Trilogy" (live) – 7:10

Maxi-single
 "Around the World" – 3:58
 "Parallel Universe" (demo) – 5:33
 "Teatro Jam" – 3:06
 "Me and My Friends" (live) – 3:08
 All live tracks were recorded in Södra Teatern, Stockholm (1999)

Personnel
Red Hot Chili Peppers
 Anthony Kiedis – lead vocals
 John Frusciante – guitar, backing vocals
 Flea – bass
 Chad Smith – drums, shaker, wood block

Additional personnel
 Greg Kurstin – keyboard

Charts

Release history

References

1999 singles
1999 songs
Music videos directed by Stéphane Sednaoui
Red Hot Chili Peppers songs
Song recordings produced by Rick Rubin
Songs written by Anthony Kiedis
Songs written by Chad Smith
Songs written by Flea (musician)
Songs written by John Frusciante